The Florida State University College of Music, located in Tallahassee, Florida, is one of sixteen colleges comprising Florida State University. The college houses two Grammy winners, a former concertmaster of the New York Philharmonic, a Pulitzer Prize-winning composer, a former leading tenor of the Metropolitan Opera, and the world's leading scholar in music therapy. As the third-largest music program in higher education, the college's comprehensive curricula embrace all traditional areas of music and world music study from the baccalaureate to the doctoral level.

Notable people

Alumni
 David Cordle, current Provost and Vice President for Academic Affairs at Emporia State University.

Faculty

Leon Anderson
Scotty Barnhart
Yvonne Ciannella
Ernst von Dohnányi
Carlisle Floyd
Janice Harsanyi
Edward Kilenyi
Ladislav Kubík
Stanford Olsen
Marcus Roberts
Pietro Spada
André J. Thomas
Ellen Taaffe Zwilich

References

External links

 
Music schools in Florida
Educational institutions established in 1901
Education in Tallahassee, Florida
Universities and colleges in Leon County, Florida
1901 establishments in Florida